The 2021 Kent State Golden Flashes football team represented Kent State University in the 2021 NCAA Division I FBS football season. They were led by fourth-year head coach Sean Lewis and played their home games at Dix Stadium in Kent, Ohio, as members of the East Division of the Mid-American Conference.

Previous season

The Golden Flashes finished the 2020 season 3–1 to finish in second place in the East Division.

Schedule

Game summaries

at No. 6 Texas A&M

VMI

at No. 5 Iowa

at Maryland

Bowling Green

Buffalo

at Western Michigan

at Ohio

Northern Illinois

at Central Michigan

at Akron

Miami (OH)

vs. Northern Illinois (MAC Championship Game)

vs. Wyoming (Famous Idaho Potato Bowl)

References

Kent State
Kent State Golden Flashes football seasons
Kent State Golden Flashes football